5476 Mulius, provisional designation:  is a mid-sized Jupiter trojan from the Trojan camp, approximately  in diameter. It was discovered on 2 October 1989, by American astronomer Schelte Bus at the Cerro Tololo Inter-American Observatory in Chile. The dark Jovian asteroid has a rotation period of 5.8 hours. It was numbered in March 1993. In November 2021, it was named after the Trojan warrior Mulius, who was killed by Achilles during the Trojan War, according to Greek mythology.

Classification and orbit 

Mulius is a Jupiter trojan which stays in a 1:1 orbital resonance with Jupiter. It is located in the trailering Trojan camp at the Gas Giant's  Lagrangian point, 60° behind its orbit . It is also a non-family asteroid of the Jovian background population.

It orbits the Sun at a distance of 4.7–5.5 AU once every 11 years and 7 months (4,217 days; semi-major axis of 5.11 AU). Its orbit has an eccentricity of 0.07 and an inclination of 14° with respect to the ecliptic. The asteroid was first observed at Palomar Observatory in August 1952. One year later, the body's observation arc begins at Palomar in August 1953, or more than 36 years prior to its official discovery observation at Cerro Tololo.

Numbering and naming 

This minor planet was numbered by the Minor Planet Center on 8 March 1993. On 29 November 2021, IAU's Working Group Small Body Nomenclature  it from Greek mythology after Trojan warrior Mulius, who was killed during the Trojan War by Achilles who drove his javelin through one ear and out the other of Mulius' head.

Physical characteristics 

Mulius is an assumed C-type asteroid. Jovian asteroids are typically D-types, with the remainder being mostly carbonaceous C- and primitive P-type asteroids.

Rotation period 

Four nights of photometric observations of this asteroid were used to build a lightcurve showing a rotation period of  hours with a brightness variation of 0.30 magnitude. The well-defined lightcurve was obtained during February 1994 by Stefano Mottola and Anders Erikson using the ESO 1-metre telescope at the La Silla Observatory in Chile.

Diameter and albedo 

According to the survey carried out by the NEOWISE mission of NASA's Wide-field Infrared Survey Explorer, the asteroid measures 35.1 kilometers in diameter and its surface has an albedo of 0.099, while the Collaborative Asteroid Lightcurve Link assumes a standard albedo for a carbonaceous asteroid of 0.057 and calculates a larger diameter of 42.2 kilometers.

References

External links 
 Asteroid Lightcurve Database (LCDB), query form (info )
 Discovery Circumstances: Numbered Minor Planets (5001)-(10000) – Minor Planet Center
 Asteroid (5476) 1989 TO11 at the Small Bodies Data Ferret
 
 

005476
Discoveries by Schelte J. Bus
Named minor planets
19891002